Grand Lakes, Texas is a  "master planned community" located in the extraterritorial jurisdiction of Houston within Fort Bend and Harris Counties in the U.S. state of Texas.

Schools in this area
Katy Independent School District

Nearby Shopping
 Katy Mills
 LaCenterra at Cinco Ranch

Churches
 Grand Lakes Presbyterian Church

See also

 Grand Lakes Community Website

Planned communities in the United States
Geography of Fort Bend County, Texas
Geography of Harris County, Texas